A payload specialist (PS) was an individual selected and trained by commercial or research organizations for flights of a specific payload on a NASA Space Shuttle mission. People assigned as payload specialists included individuals selected by the research community, a company or consortium flying a commercial payload aboard the spacecraft, and non-NASA astronauts designated by international partners.  Following the destruction of Columbia in 2003, no more payload specialists ever flew.

The term refers to both the individual and to the position on the Shuttle crew.

History

The National Aeronautics and Space Act of 1958 states that NASA should provide the "widest practicable and appropriate dissemination of information concerning its activities and the results thereof". The Naugle panel of 1982 concluded that carrying civilians—those not part of the NASA Astronaut Corps—on the Space Shuttle was part of "the purpose of adding to the public's understanding of space flight".

Payload specialists usually fly for a single specific mission. Chosen outside the standard NASA mission specialist selection process, they are exempt from certain NASA requirements such as colorblindness. Roger Crouch and Ulf Merbold are examples of those who flew in space despite not meeting NASA physical requirements; the agency's director of crew training Jim Bilodeau said in April 1981 "we'll be able to take everybody but the walking wounded". Payload specialists were not required to be United States citizens, but had to be approved by NASA and undergo rigorous but shorter training. In contrast, a Space Shuttle mission specialist was selected as a NASA astronaut first and then assigned to a mission.

Payload specialists on early missions were technical experts to join specific payloads such as a commercial or scientific satellite. On Spacelab and other missions with science components, payload specialists were scientists with expertise in specific experiments. The term also applied to representatives from partner nations who were given the opportunity of a first flight on board of the Space Shuttle (such as Saudi Arabia and Mexico), to Congressmen and the Teacher in Space program. Under Secretary of the Air Force Edward C. Aldridge Jr. was offered a seat to improve relations between NASA and the United States Air Force.

NASA expected to also fly "citizen astronauts", ordinary Americans who could describe space to others. In August 1984 President Ronald Reagan announced the Teacher in Space Project, the first such program. NASA expected to fly reporters (Journalist in Space Project), entertainers, and creative types later.

NASA categorized full-time international astronauts as payload specialists unless they received NASA mission specialist training, which some did. Bilodeau estimated that payload specialists would receive a couple of hundred hours of training over four or five weeks. International or scientific payload specialists were generally assigned a back-up who trained alongside the primary payload specialist and would replace him/her in the event of illness or other disability. Both primary and backup payload specialists received mission-specific and general training. Michael Lampton estimated that about 20% of his training was general, including firefighter school, capsule communicator duty, and use of Personal Egress Air Packs and the space toilet. He described training for Spacelab 1 as "going back to graduate school but majoring in everything"; as the first mission it tested Spacelab's versatility in "medical, metallurgical, remote sensing, astronomy, microgravity, lots more".

Payload specialists operated experiments, and participated in experiments needing human subjects. Charles D. Walker recalled that Senator Jake Garn "and I were the obvious subjects" for Rhea Seddon's echocardiograph on STS-51-D. "We really didn’t have much of a choice in whether we were going to be subjects or not. 'You're a payload specialist; you’re going to be a subject.'" Besides his own electrophoresis work, Walker operated an unrelated experiment for the University of Alabama Birmingham, and helped build homemade repair tools for a satellite launched on the mission.

Payload specialists were flown from 1983 (STS-9) to 2003 (STS-107). The last flown payload specialist was the first Israeli astronaut, Ilan Ramon, who was killed in the Columbia disaster on mission STS-107 with the rest of the crew.

Criticism
Within NASA, Johnson Space Center (JSC) controlled crewed spaceflight by selecting professional, full-time astronauts. The payload specialist program gave Marshall Space Flight Center (MSFC)—which supervised Spacelab, including a contracted European Space Agency-chosen payload specialist—control as well, causing conflicts. JSC director Chris Kraft and members of the NASA astronaut corps believed that mission specialists—many with doctoral degrees or other scientific background, and all with full-time astronaut training—could operate all experiments. Rick Chappell, chief scientist of MSFC, believed that the scientific community insisted on its own scientists being able to operate experiments in exchange for support of the Space Shuttle program. While mission specialists could operate most experiments, "Since we could take passengers, why not take at least a couple of passengers who had spent their whole careers doing the kind of research they were going to do in space?" he said.

During the Space Shuttle design process, some said that crews should be no larger than four people; both for safety, and because a commander, pilot, mission specialist, and payload specialist were sufficient for any mission. NASA expected to fly more payload specialists so designed a larger vehicle. Only NASA astronauts piloted the space shuttle, but mission specialist astronauts worried about competing with American and international payload specialists for very limited flight opportunities. In 1984 about 45 mission specialists competed for about 15 seats on the five shuttle flights. Only three payload specialists flew that year, but in 1985 eight of nine shuttle flights carried 15 payload specialists (Walker flying twice), no doubt angering mission specialists. Some payload specialists like Walker and Byron Lichtenberg were rejected as full-time astronauts but flew as payload specialists before many selected as such, and some may have flown without understanding the level of danger. Many astronauts worried that without years of training together they would not be able to trust payload specialists in an emergency; Henry Hartsfield described their concern as "If you had a problem on orbit, am I going to have to babysit this person?" NASA's preference for its own training caused the agency to offer some international payload specialists the opportunity to become mission specialists, the first being Claude Nicollier.

Those skeptical of the payload specialist program were less critical of scientists and experts like Walker than non-expert passengers ("part-timers", according to Mike Mullane, who called the program public relations-driven and immoral in Riding Rockets) like 
Garn, US Representative Bill Nelson, and other civilians such as Teacher in Space Christa McAuliffe. They saw Senator John Glenn as a passenger despite being a former Mercury Seven astronaut. A 1986 post-Challenger article in The Washington Post reviewed the issue, reporting that as far back as 1982, NASA was concerned with finding reasonable justifications for flying civilians on the Shuttle as was directed by the Reagan administration. The article says that "A review of records and interviews with past and present NASA and government officials shows the civilian program's controversial background, with different groups pushing for different approaches". The article concludes with:

Payload specialists were aware of full-time astronauts' dislike of the program. Garn advised STS-51-D colleague Jeffrey A. Hoffman to not play poker because, the astronaut quoted, "'It took you a while to disguise your initial skepticism about this whole thing'". Merbold said that at JSC he was treated as an intruder. Once payload specialists were assigned to a mission, however, full-time astronauts treated them respectfully and often began long-term friendships. Mullane became less critical of them after his first mission; he and Hartsfield approved of Walker, as did Hoffman of Garn after STS-51-D.

List of all payload specialists

Until Challenger

Post-Challenger to Columbia

Alternate and back-up (not flown) payload specialists

Other statistics

Multiple flights

Payload specialists who later trained as mission specialists

All were international astronauts.
Marc Garneau – mission specialist on STS-77, STS-97
Mamoru Mohri –  mission specialist on STS-99
Steven MacLean –  mission specialist on STS-115
Hans Schlegel –  mission specialist on STS-122
Umberto Guidoni –  mission specialist on STS-100
Robert Thirsk – completed training, flew on Soyuz TMA-15
Bjarni Tryggvason – completed training, retired in June 2008 without flying again

See also
List of human spaceflights
List of Space Shuttle missions
List of Space Shuttle crews

Notes

References

External links
Biographies of Payload Specialists on NASA web site.

Astronauts